Luigi de' Rossi (1474–1519) was an Italian Roman Catholic cardinal.

Biography

Luigi de' Rossi was born in Florence on 6 August 1474, the son of Leonetto de' Rossi and Maria de' Medici, a member of the House of Medici. He was a cousin of Giovanni de' Medici, the future Pope Leo X, on his mother's side. He and his cousin were educated together.

Early in his career, he became a protonotary apostolic.

Pope Leo X made him a cardinal priest in the consistory of 1 July 1517. He received the red hat and the titular church of San Clemente on 6 July 1517.

He died in Rome on 20 August 1519. He was initially buried in St. Peter's Basilica; his remains were later transferred to Santa Felicita, Florence.

References

1474 births
1519 deaths
16th-century Italian cardinals
Clergy from Florence